Landvetter is a locality situated in Härryda Municipality, Västra Götaland County, Sweden. It had 7,152 inhabitants in 2010.

It is the second largest town in the municipality and has given its name to the international airport Göteborg Landvetter Airport, located 5 km east of Landvetter.

The name Landvetter is a combination of "land" (land) and "vittir", an old Swedish name for a certain type of fire.

City Airline had its head office in the Air Cargo Building on the grounds of Göteborg Landvetter Airport in Landvetter. When Transwede Airways existed, its head office was on the airport property.

Sports
The following sports clubs are located in Landvetter:
Landvetter IS
and at least a dozen others

References

External links

Populated places in Västra Götaland County
Populated places in Härryda Municipality